Rachana circumdata is a butterfly of the family Lycaenidae first described by Heinz G. Schroeder, Colin G. Treadaway and Hisakazu Hayashi in 1978. It is found on Marinduque in the Philippines.

Subspecies
Rachana circumdata circumdata Schroeder, Treadaway & H. Hayashi, [1981] (Luzon, Camiguin de Luzon, Marinduque and Mindoro Islands)
Rachana circumdata panayensis Schroeder, Treadaway & H. Hayashi, [1981] (Cebu, Panay and Negros Islands)

References

Schröder, Heinz; Treadaway, Colin G. & Hayashi, Hisakazu (1981). "Zur Kenntnis philippinischer Lycaenidae (Lep.)". Entomologische Zeitschrift. 24: 265–269.
Treadaway, C. G. (1995). "Checklist of the butterflies of the Philippine Islands (Lepidoptera: Rhopalocera)" Nachrichten des Entomologischen Vereins Apollo. Suppl. 14: 7–118.

Treadaway, Colin G. & Schröder, Heinz G. (2012). "Revised checklist of the butterflies of the Philippine Islands (Lepidoptera: Rhopalocera)". Nachrichten des Entomologischen Vereins Apollo. Suppl. 20: 1-64.

Butterflies described in 1981
Iolaini